The 2010 Polish Figure Skating Championships were held in three parts:
 Senior competitions were held as a part of 2010 Three Nationals Championships in Cieszyn on December 18–20, 2009.
 Junior competitions were held in Opole on February 5–7, 2010. Children from Gold and Silver categories had their Cup of Poland competition (equivalent of Polish National Championships) at the same time, as well as novice Synchronized.
 Novice competitions were held in Cieszyn during the 2010 Three Nationals Championships but only ice dancers skated internationally.

Senior results

The Three National Championships were held simultaneously and the results were then split by country. The top three skaters from each country formed their national podiums.

Men

Ladies

Pairs

Ice dancing

Junior results

Men

Ladies

Pairs

Ice dancing

Synchronized

Novice results

Men

Ladies

Ice dancing

Synchronized

External links
 Senior level and Novice ice dance results at the Polish Figure Skating Association
 Junior and Children level results at the Polish Figure Skating Association
 Novice single results at the Polish Figure Skating Association
 Children level results at the Polish Figure Skating Association

Polish Figure Skating Championships
2009 in figure skating
Polish Figure Skating Championships, 2010
Fig
Figure Skating Championships, 2010